The inline hockey competition at the 2022 World Games took place in July 2022, in Birmingham in United States, at the Birmingham Crossplex.
Originally scheduled to take place in July 2021, the Games were rescheduled for July 2022 as a result of the 2020 Summer Olympics postponement due to the COVID-19 pandemic.

Qualification

Participating nations

Medal table

Medalists

References

External links
 The World Games 2022
 WorldSkate
 Results book

2022
2022 World Games